Peola is an unincorporated community in Garfield County, Washington, United States.

Notable people
Walter James Fitzgerald, American Roman Catholic bishop

Notes

Unincorporated communities in Garfield County, Washington
Unincorporated communities in Washington (state)